Birmingham, Pennsylvania may refer to:
Birmingham, Allegheny County, Pennsylvania (now South Side Pittsburgh)
Birmingham, Huntingdon County, Pennsylvania
Birmingham Township, Chester County, Pennsylvania

or occasionally to
 Chadds Ford Township, Delaware County, Pennsylvania, formerly known as Birmingham Township and before 1790 part of the Chester County township.